The Locomotives of the Midland Railway (which it always referred to as engines), followed its small engine policy. The policy was later adopted by the London, Midland and Scottish Railway, and contrasted with the London and North Western Railway's policy. The small engine policy was partly the consequence of a difference in the background of senior managers. In most railway companies, the elite position was the design, construction and maintenance of  locomotives. Bigger engines brought more prestige and allowed longer trains. In the Midland, the marketing department was paramount. They recognised that people wanted more frequent, shorter trains rather than an infrequent service. It concentrated on very light, very fast and frequent trains.

Overview

The small engine policy was, perhaps, carried on too long, giving rise to the derisive poem:
M is for Midland with engines galore
Two on each train and asking for more

Prior to around 1900, the Midland's locomotives were not noticeably different in size or power to those of other British railway companies; what was more notable was the company's commitment to standardisation of a small number of related locomotive designs. This policy began in the 1850s with Matthew Kirtley as Chief Mechanical Engineer. Kirtley provided two basic engine types - 0-6-0 locomotives for freight and 2-4-0 types for passenger work. Over 800 Kirtley 0-6-0s and 150 2-4-0s were built up to 1873. Samuel W. Johnson and Richard Deeley continued the policy but with a gradual progression in the locomotive designs. By 1914 the entire Midland network was being operated by six basic engine designs: a Class 1 0-6-0 tank engine for light freight and shunting, Class 1 0-4-4T tank engine for light passenger work, Class 2 4-4-0 engine for general passenger work, Class 3 0-6-0 engines in tank and tender variants for mixed traffic and freight, and Class 4 4-4-0 for express passenger work. This degree of standardisation was exceptional amongst the pre-grouping British railway companies. All the Midland designs were built to the same basic design principles and a 'kit' of parts meaning that many parts such as boilers, cylinders, wheels, cabs and bearings were interchangeable across some or all of the six types.

During the 1890s, a new phase in British locomotive development began with the arrival of 'large engine' designs to cope with rising average train weights for both passenger and freight traffic and demand for faster journey times. This new generation of engines featured much larger, more efficient boilers and were physically larger, heavier and more powerful than the locomotives commonly built in the preceding 40 years. During the 1900s, many British railways began introducing new locomotive designs, with the 4-6-0 becoming predominant for express passenger work, the 0-8-0 for heavy freight trains and the 2-6-0 for fast freight and mixed traffic. Unusually amongst the large British railways, the Midland chose not to develop its own 'large engines' - when such designs were proposed by both Johnson and Deeley, they were rejected by the railway's management. Instead the Midland chose to continue production of its existing locomotive designs largely unchanged and thus adopted the 'small engine policy' for the 20th century.

Origins of the Small Engine Policy
The Midland was fortunate in that George Stephenson had built its main lines with very shallow gradients, while its main rival the LNWR had to cope with the hilly country north of Lancaster. The Midland favoured building large numbers of relatively small, low-powered engines to standardised designs. Each engine was cheaper to build and run than a larger equivalent and while more locomotives were required, the Midland's Derby Works was able to achieve economies of scale. The Midland found that on the majority of its well-graded lines a single small engine was sufficient, and that it was more efficient to add either more trains of a shorter length to handle greater demand or to employ multiple small engines (two or three) when heavier trains were needed. This was deemed preferable to building a small number of large engines for the routes and duties that required them which did not fit into Derby's standardised production and risked being underutilised and incurring expensive running costs unnecessarily. Indeed, the Midland's operations were often based around keeping even its small engines lightly loaded at a time when other railways were not only building larger, more powerful locomotives but working them to their maximum capacity with the heaviest trains possible. The Midland's philosophy was to keep individual train weights as low as was practically possible and run more trains, providing short-term economies in fuel consumption and wear-and-tear on the locomotive, which in the long term meant that Midland locomotives generally enjoyed longer service lives than hard-worked contemporaries on other railways. This was one reason why the relatively undersized standard Midland axle bearing was successfully retained for so long into the 20th century - under Midland operating practices the loads imposed on the bearing by a low-powered locomotive working well within its capabilities were minimised.

The overall interlinked light-use design/operate philosophy was formalised in 1907 when, under chairman George Ernest Paget and Traffic Inspector John Follows, the Midland introduced a new traffic management system whereby every locomotive type was assigned a single standardised workload (in contrast to the system used by other railways, including the Midland's main competitor the London and North Western Railway, whereby new or freshly-overhauled locomotives were given higher workloads, with locomotives progressively being assigned less arduous tasks as their condition deteriorated towards the next overhaul). This required that the standard workload had to be, to a extent, a 'worst case' scenario of a worn-out locomotive immediately due an overhaul, with the result that train loads were kept low and engines in good condition were not worked to their maximum. This system also ensured the continuation of the Midland's practice of continuing to run shorter, lighter but more frequent trains (against the industry trend for longer, heavier but fewer services) since the Midland's service timings were calculated on the basis of relatively low power being available.

Advantages and Disadvantages
The advantages were in the lower maintenance and fuel costs in ensuring that most engines were not worked to their limit, the permitting of standardised maintenance and inspection intervals (since individual locomotives did not have to be regularly assessed to ascertain their suitability for the work assigned to them) and the simplicity of rostering engines for work, as Midland shed managers could be confident that every engine they had available would be capable of the duty assigned. This allowed the Midland to greatly improve its punctuality and timekeeping - which had been poor in the late 19th century and a source of bad publicity - since the timetables and train loads could be drawn to also assume the standard 'worst case' locomotive power available, while most of the engines actually in service were in better condition than that. 

One upshot of the new management system was that the Midland followed the practice common on American railways of putting the role of Motive Power Superintendent (responsible for managing and allocating the railway's locomotive stock in service) under the authority of the Operating Department (with overall responsibility for managing the railway's services and timetables in response to demand) rather than the role being subordinate to the Chief Mechanical Engineer (responsible for providing and maintaining locomotives) as was usual in British railway companies. This had the effect of Midland locomotive policy from approximately 1910, further formalising the concept of more frequent, lighter trains hauled by relatively small locomotives - a situation which favoured the goal of the Operating Department (greater frequency, flexibility and overall volume of services) at the expense of the Motive Power Superintendent's natural preference for a smaller number of more powerful locomotives (a smaller number of more easily-managed, less labour-intensive assets performing the same work) or the ability of the Derby works (under the CME) to design such locomotives. 

Smaller, less powerful engines also allowed savings in civil engineering upgrades as they permitted lighter-laid track and cheaper bridges to be retained for longer into the 20th century - thus there is an interaction with Route Availability - primarily based on axle loadings - although this concept was not formalised into classifications in Midland or LMS days (contrast to the Great Western Railway, q.v.). In turn this acted against the widespread adoption of larger, heavier engines as this would require a simultaneous large-scale civil engineering programme to improve the Midland's permanent way and associated structures. Similarly, the Midland was unusual among British railways by continuing to favour roundhouses to stable and service its locomotives instead of the more common longitudinal shed. While a shed could be relatively easy expanded and lengthened to accommodate larger locomotives, the roundhouses could not, further adding a secondary cost to adopting large engines. Another such factor was that decades of running light, short trains meant that the Midland's network featured shorter-than-average sidings and passing loops - if more powerful locomotives were to be procured and used to the full, these would have to be rebuilt to work with longer trains.

The small engine policy served the Midland well when its network was confined to the English Midlands, which is largely free of steep gradients. As the company expanded into other parts of Britain the policy's downsides began to cause problems. The company's own main line to Scotland (the Settle-Carlisle Line) and the Somerset and Dorset Joint Railway (where the Midland was responsible for providing locomotives) were renowned for their steep gradients and the company's locomotive stock proved badly suited to the task. Nonetheless the small engine policy remained and double-heading or banking was used to make up for the shortfall in power. The policy also greatly reduced capacity on the Midland's network as not only were there more (but smaller) trains than there would have been on another railway but further capacity was taken up by the need to accommodate light engines that had been used for piloting or banking duties that were returning to their depots. The small engine policy was a contributing factor to two fatal accidents on the Settle-Carlisle Line, at Hawes Junction and Ais Gill. In the former case it was due to excessive light-engine movements and in the latter due to a train stalling on the main line due to a lack of power.

The End of the Policy
The small engine policy remained in place into the 1920s and remained an influence during the early years of the Midland's successor the London, Midland and Scottish Railway, its Chief Mechanical Engineer for most of the 1920s being Henry Fowler, a long-standing Midland engineer and former CME of that company. James Anderson was made Chief Motive Power Superintendent of the new LMS. Anderson was also from the Midland, was a trained locomotive engineer, had been draughtsman and works manager at Derby Works and had been appointed temporary CME of the Midland when Fowler was seconded to the British government to manage wartime production of munitions and aircraft. The corporate management structure of the Midland, with the Operating Department overseeing the role of the Motive Power Superintendent, continued in a somewhat de facto fashion in the early years of the LMS.

Midland-era standard designs were continued or lightly updated and constructed for use across the new LMS network. Many of these types proved ill-suited or inadequate for routes and operating practices away from ex-Midland territory - while ex-Midland locomotives were imposed on the new LMS, the operational practices that went with them were not, on top of still-rising demands with regard to train speeds and weights. This left Midland-designed 'small engines' being worked to the full on heavy trains by crews used to working their engines as hard as possible. Under these conditions many of the designs proved inadequate in terms of both performance and reliability (such as the frequent axle bearing failures afflicting many ex-Midland LMS engines in the 1920s) and this left the LMS with a shortage of modern motive power by the late 1920s. Fowler oversaw the introduction of the Royal Scot class locomotives in 1927, which effectively ended the Midland small engine tradition - they were in fact built by the North British Locomotive Company which also had a large part in the design process, further assisted by plans of the Southern Railway's Lord Nelson class being provided to the LMS. Fowler was superseded by William Stanier in 1932 who brought in a new generation of modern 'large engine' designs, greatly influenced by his previous employer, the Great Western Railway.

Numbering and classification 
Before 1907, locomotive numbering was somewhat erratic. New locomotives might take the numbers of old engines, which were placed on the duplicate list and had an A suffix added to their numbers. In 1907, the whole stock were renumbered in a systematic way, each class in a consecutive sequence, classes being ordered by type (passenger/tank/goods), power and age. After the grouping
this system was adapted for the whole LMS.

The Midland classified their stock into three classes numbered 1 to 3 with 1 the least powerful and 3 the most. Stock was also split into passenger and freight engines. When the two largest 4-4-0 classes (the 3-cylinder compounds and the "999s") were introduced, these were put into Class 4. This system formed the basis for the subsequent LMS and BR classification systems.

Engines inherited from constituent companies 
The Midland Railway formed in 1844 from the Midland Counties Railway, the North Midland Railway and the Birmingham and Derby Junction Railway, and took over a number of others including the Leicester and Swannington Railway and the Birmingham and Gloucester Railway.

For further reading, see:

Midland Counties Railway Locomotives
North Midland Railway Locomotives
Birmingham and Derby Junction Railway Locomotives

Engines built by the Midland
Initially, the Midland concentrated on maintaining and improving the somewhat varied fleet that it had inherited, with the assistance of The Railway Foundry in Leeds. In addition, it bought in twenty-four of their Jenny Lind locomotives and, in 1848, two unique Crampton locomotives.

Ex- LT&SR (1912-1922) 

In 1912 the Midland bought the London, Tilbury and Southend Railway, but this continued to be operated more or less separately.  The Midland, and the LMS subsequently built some LT&SR designs.

Liveries 

Prior to 1883 painted green.  After 1883 the Midland adopted its distinctive crimson lake livery for passenger engines.

Influence on LMS locomotive policy 

The London, Midland and Scottish Railway (LMS) continued the Midland's small engine policy until William Stanier arrived in 1933.  The last new Midland design was Stanier 0-4-4T of 1932/3 but some Fowler 4Fs were constructed as late as 1941.

Preservation 

Five original Midland locomotives have survived, these being:

In addition, there are 13 engines of two classes built by the LMS to essentially Midland designs:

 4F 0-6-0 Nos (4)4027 (4)4123 and (4)4422
 3F 0-6-0T Nos  16576/(4)7493, (4)7279 (4)7324, (4)7327, (4)7357, (4)7383 (4)7406 (4)7445 (4)7564 and (4)7298

And two engines built by the Midland for the Somerset and Dorset Joint Railway:

 S&DJR 7F 2-8-0 Nos 88 and 89 (later 9678/9, 13808/9, 53808/9).

Also, one ex-LT&SR engine which passed through Midland ownership:

 LT&SR 79 Class No. 80 Thundersley

Two post-grouping NCC locomotives also survive.

NCC Class U2  74 Dunluce Castle
NCC Class WT No. 4

Further, there are several more engines to later non-Midland designs built at Derby which have survived.

References

Sources

Further reading 
The main works on Midland engines are given by two four volume histories, as follows:
 Bob Essery and David Jenkinson An Illustrated Review of Midland Locomotives from 1883 (Didcot, Oxon: Wild Swan Publications)
Vol. 1 – A general survey 
Vol. 2 – Passenger tender classes (1988) 
Vol. 3 – Tank engines 
Vol. 4 – Goods tender classes (1989)  
 Stephen Summerson Midland Railway Locomotives – Irwell Press
Vol. 1 – A comprehensive primary account, general survey 1844–1922, growth and development, boilers, tenders, fittings and details. 
Vol. 2 – The Kirtley classes. 
Vol. 3 – Johnson classes part 1 : the slim boiler passenger tender engines, passenger and goods tank engines. 
Vol. 4 – Johnson classes part 2 : the goods and later passenger tender engines, Deeley, Fowler and LTSR classes. 

Also useful is:
 Bob Essery and David Jenkinson LMS Locomotives Vol. 4 Absorbed pre-group Classes Midland Division

External links 

 Some photographs of Midland engines from the Midland Railway Society

British railway-related lists
 
Midland Railway
Midland Railway